Jeni's Splendid Ice Creams is an artisan ice cream company headquartered in Columbus, Ohio. Jeni's has over 60 branded 'scoop shops' and retail distributors nationally.

History 

Jeni Britton Bauer is the founder and chief creative officer of Jeni's Splendid Ice Creams.

Before starting Jeni's Splendid Ice Creams, Jeni Britton Bauer attended Ohio State University and studied art history and fine art. While in college, one of her friends was a chemistry graduate student who gave her vials of scented chemicals, which led her to gather essential oils, make her own perfume, and sell her perfumes for a few years.

Bauer experimented with the scentless, spicy essential oil of cayenne pepper and decided to mush it into chocolate ice cream to make spicy frozen chocolate. She realized that ice cream was "the perfect carrier of scent," and she immediately started making many other flavors of ice cream with essential oils. Two weeks later, she decided that she wanted to make scented ice cream as a business and dropped out of Ohio State.

Britton Bauer teamed up with one of her friends and attempted multiple times to open up a stall in Columbus's North Market area. However, the market constantly rejected them because it did not believe that an ice cream store had a place in their market. The North Market reconsidered when PBS aired a feature about ice cream being sold at a market.

In 1996, Bauer opened the prototype store in the North Market area of Columbus, and she called it Scream Ice Creams. Bauer was there for 10 years on the front line listening to customer feedback, and then tweaking her recipes, growing her artisanal product and later changing an entire category. Some of the first few flavors were Salty Caramel, Wildberry Lavender, and Hot Chocolate. After making her own ice cream for four years, Britton Bauer closed Scream and decided to attend the ice cream short course at Penn State.

Later, the first Jeni's Splendid Ice Creams opened in 2002, also in the North Market, which was different from Scream in several ways. While Scream offered its customers only one flavor at a time, Jeni's offered several flavors. Within the first year, her boyfriend's brother joined the company, making him the third member of the company in addition to Jeni and then-boyfriend now-husband Charly.

Three years later, in 2005, a state regulator alerted Jeni's that they did not have a proper license required to sell ice cream in a market. As a result, Britton Bauer and her colleagues realized that they needed to open a new ice cream production facility instead of making the ice cream in the market. In 2006, Jeni opened her first store out of the market and continued to expand into other locations in the area. In 2009, after Jeni, Charly, and Charly's brother realized that they needed a CEO, their close friend John Lowe quit his job at General Electric to become the company's first CEO.

The brand partnered with Uncle Nearest Premium Whiskey in 2022 for the non-alcoholic 'Boozy Egg Nog' flavor.

Listeria Events 
On April 23, 2015, Jeni's initiated a recall of all products due to food safety concerns and a possible presence of Listeria in their products. Jeni's initiated a second listeria-related recall in June 2015, connected to the first recall.

In the listeria aftermath, Jeni wrote a blog post introducing the implementation of a testing and control program, writing: "I mentioned that our program was aggressive: we did almost 200 swabs every day for two months in our 2,000-square-foot production kitchen—almost "1,000 times" beyond the industry recommendation—to understand where the Listeria was coming from and eliminate it." "We have multiple third parties inspecting our kitchen just to make sure that we’re doing everything right."..."When I look back, I think of it as a time when we were kind of clarified by fire and we learned about ourselves."

Locations and distribution 

, "Scoop Shops" are located in fourteen states and the District of Columbia. Jeni's Splendid Ice Creams pints are also distributed in over 3,000 high-end groceries and markets nationwide, as well as through mail order. In 2021, the company brought in $95.7 million.

Reviews 

Jeni's received a positive review on the "Hot and Spicy" episode of Food Network's show The Best Thing I Ever Ate (2010). It was reviewed in The Washington Post (2011), The Huffington Post (2012), and U.S. News & World Report, who ranked it #1 in America in 2012. The Chicago Tribune (2011) said "Jeni's Splendid Ice Creams is gaining a national reputation for producing superior desserts made of milk sourced from a family farm in Ohio's Appalachian region." Time magazine said it "has a large cult following among Ohio émigrés and ice cream geeks."

The Atlantic positively reviewed it saying "Jeni's flavors are not successful simply because they are irreverent and ground-breaking. They work because a great deal of effort has gone into their crafting--what at first glance seems whimsical, upon first bite is proven artisanal." It has also been positively reviewed in The New York Times (2011), and by Today (2012). In 2007, The New York Times said Jeni's had "surpassed the creativity of all other ice cream makers with its versions like goat cheese and Cognac fig sauce."

Awards 
In 2012, Jeni's received a sofi Gold Award in the "Dessert or Dessert Topping" category for Lemon Frozen Yogurt. In 2013, Jeni's won another sofi Gold Award in the "Outstanding Product Line" category. Beginning with her early days at Scream and continuing to the present, Britton Bauer's ice cream has incorporated products local to Columbus and Ohio, including milk, fruit, and whiskey.

Fast Company named Jeni Britton Bauer one of the Most Creative People in Business in 2018. In 2019, Inc. listed Jeni's as #2329 on its Inc. 5000 list.

Britton Bauer received an honorary doctorate in business administration from Ohio State, the university she had attended but left in her sophomore year to pursue a career in ice cream, after serving as the commencement speaker at the summer 2016 graduation.

Jeni's cookbooks 
In 2011, Jeni Britton Bauer published her first cookbook, Jeni's Splendid Ice Creams at Home, which became a New York Times best-seller and The Wall Street Journal called it the "homemade-ice cream-making Bible." Britton Bauer won a James Beard Foundation Award, the highest honor for writing about culinary arts and food, for her cookbook. The book was also nominated for the Goodreads Choice Awards Best Food & Cookbooks that year.

Britton Bauer published Jeni's Splendid Ice Cream Desserts in 2014 "to provide an audience with the tools to craft their own ice cream-based creations".

In March 2019, Britton Bauer published her third cookbook, The Artisanal Kitchen: Perfect Homemade Ice Cream: The Best Make-It Yourself Ice Creams, Sorbets, Sundaes, and Other Desserts.

Select list of flavors

References

External links 
 How I Built This - Live Episode! Jeni's Splendid Ice Creams: Jeni Britton Bauer (audio interview)

2002 establishments in Ohio
Agriculture in Ohio
Certified B Corporations in the Food & Beverage Industry
Fast-food franchises
Ice cream brands
Ice cream parlors in the United States
Companies based in the Columbus, Ohio metropolitan area
Henry Crown Fellows